Tepakán Municipality (in the Yucatec Maya language, “place where pakán fruit [similar to tuna] is found”) is one of 106 municipalities in the Mexican state of Yucatán. Containing (134.13 km2) of land, it is roughly 70 km east of the city of Mérida.

History
During pre-Hispanic times, the area was part of the chieftainship of  Ah-Kin-Chel. After the conquest the area became part of the encomienda system with Cristóbal Sánchez as the encomendero in 1581. Subsequent holders of the trusteeship Esteban Tello Aguilar in 1700, Ana de Varreda Villegas in 1705, Antonia Pacheco and Juan Nepomuceno Calderón.

Yucatán declared its independence from the Spanish Crown in 1821. On 24 July 1867 a decree passed to reorganize the divisions within the territory and Tepakán was assigned to Izamal Municipality. In 1988, it was made its own municipality.

Governance
The municipal president is elected for a three-year term. The town council has four councilpersons, who serve as Secretary and councilors of ecology, public works, ecology, roads and markets, and cemeteries.

The Municipal Council administers the business of the municipality. It is responsible for budgeting and expenditures and producing all required reports for all branches of the municipal administration. Annually it determines educational standards for schools.

The Police Commissioners ensure public order and safety. They are tasked with enforcing regulations, distributing materials and administering rulings of general compliance issued by the council.

Communities
The head of the municipality is Tepakán, Yucatán. The other populated areas are Jabada, Kantirix, Kantunich, Pochuná, Hacienda Los Reyes, Rosario, Tecate and Xemu. The significant populations are shown below:

Local festivals
Every year on 12 April the feast of St. Anthony, patron saint of the village, is held.

Tourist attractions
 Church of La Asunción 
 Church of San Antonio
 Hacienda Kantirix
 Hacienda Poccheiná
 Hacienda Sahcatzín

References

Municipalities of Yucatán